Rick Johnson is a Canadian former politician and musician. He was a Liberal member of the Legislative Assembly of Ontario from 2009 to 2011 who represented the riding of Haliburton—Kawartha Lakes—Brock. He was elected in a by-election on March 5, 2009, defeating Progressive Conservative leader John Tory. He lost to Laurie Scott in the 2011 election who had previously held the riding.

Background
Before entering politics, Johnson was a musician, working alongside his wife Terri Crawford both in the Terry Crawford Band of the 1970s and 1980s and later as a children's music duo billed as Terri & Rick.

Politics
Johnson previously served as a public school trustee for, and chair of, the Trillium Lakelands District School Board and as president of the Ontario Public School Boards Association. In his term on the OPSBA, Johnson introduced breakfast, co-operative education and literacy programs for his district. He has also served on the Lindsay Chamber of Commerce.

Johnson was the Liberal candidate in Haliburton—Kawartha Lakes—Brock in the 2007 provincial election, losing to Laurie Scott. On January 9, 2009 Scott resigned her seat, in order to provide  Conservative Leader John Tory a seat in the legislature. Johnson capitalized on public anger from Scott's move to narrowly defeat Tory in the subsequent by-election.

Johnson served as the Parliamentary Assistant to the Minister of Infrastructure, Bob Chiarelli. He previously served as the Parliamentary Assistant to the Minister of Agriculture, Food and Rural Affairs. In the 2011 election, Johnson lost again to P.C. candidate Laurie Scott by 6,000 votes in the 2011 provincial election. He tried again in 2014 but lost again to Scott, this time by more than 3,000 votes.

Electoral record

References

External links

21st-century Canadian politicians
Canadian children's musicians
Canadian educators
Canadian male guitarists
Canadian rock guitarists
Living people
Ontario Liberal Party MPPs
Ontario school board trustees
People from Kawartha Lakes
Year of birth missing (living people)